Hemiconus gouetensis is an extinct species of sea snail, a marine gastropod mollusk, in the family Conidae, the cone snails and their allies.

Distribution
Fossils of this marine species were found in France.

References

 Cossmann, M. "Mollusques éocèniques de la Loire-inférieure. Tome 1, fasc. 2." Bulletin de la Société des Sciences naturelles de l’Ouest de la France 6.4 (1897): 180–246.
 Tracey S., Craig B., Belliard L. & Gain O. (2017). One, four or forty species? - early Conidae (Mollusca, Gastropoda) that led to a radiation and biodiversity peak in the late Lutetian Eocene of the Cotentin, NW France. Carnets de Voyages Paléontologiques dans le Bassin Anglo-Parisien. 3: 1-38.

gouetensis
Gastropods described in 1897